Magic! (stylized in all uppercase) is a Canadian reggae fusion band based in Toronto, Ontario. The band is composed of lead vocalist, guitarist/producer Nasri Atweh, guitarist/keyboardist Mark "Pelli" Pellizzer, and bassist Ben Spivak. Active since 2012, the band is signed with Latium, Sony, and RCA Records, releasing their debut studio album Don't Kill the Magic in 2014, their second studio album Primary Colours in 2016, and their third studio album Expectations in 2018. They are best known for their hit single "Rude", which charted at No. 1 in several countries worldwide, including the US and UK.

The band is heavily inspired by the Police and Bob Marley and the Wailers. They are known for having a signature reggae-influenced pop sound.

History

Early years
All members of the band are from the Toronto area of Canada. The lead singer of Magic!, Nasri, had worked with and written songs for different pop acts prior to the start of the band, mainly alongside Adam Messinger, together known as the Messengers. He met Mark Pellizzer in the studio and within a week they wrote the song "Don't Judge Me" for Chris Brown. Nasri described the chemistry between himself and Pellizzer as "different than writing chemistry, it was more artistic." A few weeks later, while Mark was playing a reggae tune on the guitar, Nasri suggested starting a band like "modern-day Police."

Next to join the band was Alex Tanas. He and Mark Pellizzer knew each other, since they both had been members of the Justin Nozuka band for several years.

Prior to joining Magic!, Ben Spivak had been playing with the Toronto-based Julian Taylor Band, releasing Never Gonna Give You Up in 2012. Julian Taylor and Jeremy Elliot had enjoyed success playing in Staggered Crossing with "Further Again" hitting #6 in 2001 on the Canadian Hot 100 chart.

2013–15: Don't Kill the Magic

Magic!'s debut single "Rude" was released on October 12, 2013. The song peaked at number six on the Canadian Hot 100 and also proved a great international success, topping the charts in the United States and the United Kingdom and peaking within the top ten of the charts in Australia, New Zealand, Denmark, the Netherlands and Sweden.

"Don't Kill the Magic" was released as the second single from the album on April 4, 2014, peaking at number twenty-two on the Canadian Hot 100 and fifty-three in Australia.

The band released their debut album Don't Kill the Magic on June 30, 2014. The album peaked to number 5 on the Canadian Albums Chart and number 6 on the Billboard 200.

On October 7, 2014, "Let Your Hair Down" was issued to contemporary hit radio by RCA Records as the third single from the album (the second to be released in the US). It peaked at number 20 on the Canadian Hot 100 chart. The official music video, directed by David Rousseau, was published online on October 31, 2014.

Magic! was among the performers at the 15th Annual Latin Grammy Awards held on November 20, 2014. Marc Anthony joined the band on stage for a special performance of "Rude".

On November 23, 2014, Wyclef Jean and Magic! performed together at the 42nd American Music Awards.

From February until June 2015, Magic! opened for Maroon 5 in North America and Europe on their Maroon V Tour. The band also had additional solo gigs.

In March 2015, Magic! won two Juno Awards - for Breakthrough Group of the Year and Single of the Year, out of five nominations. Adam Messinger won the Juno Award for Producer of the Year.

In April 2015, "No Way No" was released as a single. It peaked at number 23 in Canada. The official video had been uploaded on YouTube since March 2, 2015.

On June 13, 2015, the band was part of the line-up at the Pinkpop Festival.

On June 22, 2015, Magic! was awarded the International Achievement Award by SOCAN at the 2015 SOCAN Awards in Toronto.

On July 1, 2015, Magic! performed at Canada Day in Ottawa, and later performed at the Coca-Cola Stage at the Calgary Stampede on July 12, 2015.

On July 17, 2015, Magic! released a new single, "#SundayFunday", this ended up being a non-album single.

2016–2017: Primary Colours

On March 25, 2016, Magic! released their first single from their second album Primary Colours, called "Lay You Down Easy", this was a collaboration with Sean Paul.

On the evening of June 18, 2016, Magic! released their second single from "Primary Colours" called "Red Dress". The song was premiered on Apple's radio station Beats1. The band first heard the song premiered as they were broadcasting a Facebook live video to their fans.

On the morning of June 20, 2016, Magic! was part of the Muscular Dystrophy Association's #LiveUnlimited, they broadcast a live rehearsal video to Facebook to raise money for MDA.

The album "Primary Colours" was released on July 1, 2016.

On July 2, Magic! released a special version of their song "No Regrets" in memory of the victims of the shooting on June 12, 2016, at Pulse Nightclub in Orlando, Florida.

On March 10, 2017, they released a new collaboration with Matoma and D.R.A.M. called "Girl at Coachella" on digital and streaming services.

In October, they premiered their new single "Darts in the Dark."

2018-Present: ‘’Expectations’’
After some touring, they released a new single called "Kiss Me" on June 8, 2018.

Their third studio album ‘’Expectations’’ was released in September 2018.

In February 2022, the band announced the departure of drummer Alex Tanas.

Collaborations
Magic! is featured on Shakira's "Cut Me Deep", a track from her self-titled album, released in March 2014 and on a track on One Love, One Rhythm, the official 2014 FIFA World Cup album titled "This Is Our Time (Agora é a Nossa Hora)" released in April. They are also featured on Sun Goes Down, a track on David Guetta's album Listen, which also features Sonny Wilson on the hook, as well as production from Showtek.

Band members
 Nasri – lead vocals, guitars, piano
 Mark "Pelli" Pellizzer – guitars, keyboards, backing vocals
 Ben Spivak – bass guitar, keyboards, backing vocals

Former 
 Alex Tanas – drums, percussion, backing vocals

Discography

Studio albums

Singles

As a featured artist

Other appearances

Notes

Awards and nominations

Notes
There has been at least one significant remix of "Rude". A remix by Russian-German producer/DJ Zedd was premiered in his set at Lollapalooza 2014. It was released on 2 September 2014, Zedd's 25th birthday. Zedd had said, "I'm gonna give myself a birthday present and release my remix of "Rude" on my bday, sept 2nd!" He also released official, completed full-length audio on his Soundcloud on 28 August 2014, which garnered nearly 400,000 plays within 24 hours. While the original was still in number-one position on the Billboard Hot 100, there was speculation that release of the remix on mainstream music outlets online would assist the original song in maintaining its position on the chart.

References

Canadian world music groups
Canadian indie pop groups
Musical groups from Toronto
Reggae fusion groups
Reggae rock groups
2012 establishments in Ontario
Musical quartets
Musical groups established in 2012
RCA Records artists
Juno Award for Single of the Year winners
Juno Award for Breakthrough Group of the Year winners